Synchronised swimming at the 2015 Southeast Asian Games was held in the OCBC Aquatic Centre, in Kallang, Singapore from 2 to 4 June 2015.

Participating nations
A total of 45 athletes from six nations competed in synchronised swimming at the 2015 Southeast Asian Games:

Competition schedule
The following was the competition schedule for the synchronised swimming competitions:

Medalists

Medal table

Events

Women's duet

The women's duet competition of the synchronised swimming event at the 2015 Southeast Asian Games was held from 2–4 June 2015 at the OCBC Aquatics Centre in Singapore. The defending Southeast Asian Champion is the duet from Malaysia.

Schedule
All times are Singapore Standard Time (UTC+8).

Results (Preliminary)

Results (Final)

Women's team

The women's team competition of the synchronised swimming event at the 2015 Southeast Asian Games was held from 2–3 June 2015 at the OCBC Aquatics Centre in Singapore. The defending Southeast Asian Champion is the team from Malaysia.

Schedule
All times are Singapore Standard Time (UTC+8).

Results

Women's free combination

The women's free combination competition of the synchronised swimming event at the 2015 Southeast Asian Games was held on 4 June 2015 at the OCBC Aquatics Centre in Singapore. The defending Southeast Asian Champion is the free combination from Malaysia.

Schedule
All times are Singapore Standard Time (UTC+8).

Results

References

External links
 
 
 
 

2015
Southeast Asian Games
2015 Southeast Asian Games events
Kallang